The Ferqui Solera (sold as the Optare Solera in the United Kingdom) was a midicoach built by Spanish manufacturer Ferqui on Mercedes-Benz Atego chassis between 1997 and 2008.

As a result of a dealership arrangement between Ferqui and Optare, the Solera was badged as an Optare product in the United Kingdom throughout its production run.

Original Solera
The original Solera has the characteristic behind front axle door, this gives it an appearance of a very small coach. It has become a popular choice for independent coach companies. It is still available in a slightly updated form to match the styling of the Solera HD.

Solera HD
The Solera HD is a much updated form of the original. It removes the characteristic doorway with a conventional layout with the door ahead of the front axle. The styling has been updated to match the rest of the Optare coach range. The rollbars create a big coach appearance.

External links
Solera's product page from Optare

Solera